Joseph Wasko (born 28 November 1931) is a French former professional racing cyclist. He rode in the 1960 and 1961 Tour de France.

References

External links
 

1931 births
Living people
French male cyclists
Sportspeople from Oise
Cyclists from Hauts-de-France